Lasioptera is a genus of gall midges in the family Cecidomyiidae. There are at least 140 described species in Lasioptera.

See also
 List of Lasioptera species

References

Further reading

External links

 

Cecidomyiinae
Articles created by Qbugbot
Sciaroidea genera